Austin Speight is an association football coach and former player. He was born in Belfast, Northern Ireland and played football for Stockport County, although he did not play a Football League game for them. In the 1981/82 season, he played two league games for Finn Harps in the League of Ireland.

After retiring from his playing career, Speight coached at West Ham United, Stockport County, Manchester City, Blackburn Rovers and Crewe Alexandra. He holds the UEFA Pro Licence and has worked with prominent international footballers including David Beckham, Steven Gerrard and Joe Cole. He also serves as UK and Ireland director of coaching organization Coerver Coaching & Pro Soccer International Group.

References

League of Ireland players
Stockport County F.C. players
Finn Harps F.C. players
1962 births
Living people
Association footballers not categorized by position
Association footballers from Northern Ireland
Football managers from Northern Ireland